The 1996–97 Rhode Island Rams men's basketball team represented the University of Rhode Island in the 1996–97 college basketball season. Led by head coach Al Skinner, the Rams competed in the Atlantic 10 Conference and played their home games at Keaney Gymnasium. They finished the season 20–10, 12–4 in A-10 play and lost in the championship game of the 1997 Atlantic 10 men's basketball tournament. They were invited to the 1997 NCAA tournament as the No. 9 seed in the Southeast region. Rhode Island was beaten by No. 8 seed Purdue, 83–76 in overtime, in the opening round.

Roster

Schedule and results

|-
!colspan=9 style=| Regular season

|-
!colspan=9 style=| Atlantic 10 tournament

|-
!colspan=9 style=| NCAA tournament

Rankings

References

Rhode Island
Rhode Island
Rhode Island Rams men's basketball seasons
Rhode
Rhode